Bob Hewitt and Frew McMillan won in the final 6–4, 4–0 after Brian Gottfried and Raúl Ramírez were forced to retire.

Seeds

Draw

External links
 1976 Fischer-Grand Prix Doubles draw

Doubles